Karl-Arne Holmsten (14 August 1911 – 22 February 1995) was a Swedish film actor. He appeared in more than 80 films between 1938 and 1968. He was born in Uppsala, Sweden and died in Lidingö, Sweden.

Selected filmography

 Emilie Högquist (1939)
 Bashful Anton (1940)
 Frestelse (1940)
 Hanna in Society (1940)
 A Sailor on Horseback (1940)
Lucky Young Lady (1941)
 Magistrarna på sommarlov (1941)
 We House Slaves (1942)
 A Girl for Me (1943)
 Life and Death (1943)
 Men of the Navy (1943)
 Som folk är mest (1944)
 The Green Lift (1944)
 Dolly Takes a Chance (1944)
 The Emperor of Portugallia (1944)
 The Invisible Wall (1944)
 Blåjackor (1945)
 Vandring med månen (1945)
 Don't Give Up (1947)
 The Bride Came Through the Ceiling (1947)
 Neglected by His Wife (1947)
 Love Wins Out (1949)
 Dangerous Spring (1949)
 Woman in White (1949)
 Girl with Hyacinths (1950)
 The Kiss on the Cruise (1950)
 Fiancée for Hire (1950)
 Customs Officer Bom (1951)
 My Name Is Puck (1951)
 Secrets of Women (1952)
 U-Boat 39 (1952)
 Say It with Flowers (1952)
 One Fiancée at a Time (1952)
 Classmates (1952)
 Resan till dej (1953)
 Dance on Roses (1954)
 The Yellow Squadron (1954)
 Laugh Bomb (1954)
 The Light from Lund (1955)
 Darling of Mine (1955)
 My Passionate Longing (1956)
 Mother Takes a Vacation (1957)
 The Lady in Black (1958)
 Mannequin in Red (1958)
 We at Väddö (1958)
 Fridolf Stands Up! (1958)
 Swinging at the Castle (1959)
 Only a Waiter (1959)
 Crime in Paradise (1959)
 Rider in Blue (1959)
 When Darkness Falls (1960)
 Summer and Sinners (1960)
 Lovely Is the Summer Night (1961)
 The Lady in White (1962)
 Den gula bilen (1963)
 Här kommer bärsärkarna (1965)
 Niklasons (1965) (TV Series)
 Öbergs på Lillöga (1983) (TV Series)

References

External links

1911 births
1995 deaths
Swedish male film actors
People from Uppsala
20th-century Swedish male actors